Sunken is the debut studio album by Twin Peaks, released on July 9, 2013, on Autumn Tone Records. The album was recorded in James' basement using "a crappy iMac from 2004, a broken digital mixer, and a digital recording studio from the '90s." The title of the album comes from Sunken Gardens Park, a park in Chicago where the band used to drink as teenagers.

Reception 

The success of the album gave the group immediate critical recognition and launched them into the forefront of an emerging DIY scene in Chicago. Most of the band members were attending Evergreen State College but soon dropped out to pursue their music career.

Northern Transmission says, "you're thrown back to the 1960s to a place where guys wore leather jackets and crooned into microphones in a smoky juke joint." According to Pitchfork: "Sunken presents itself initially as an over-enthusiastic tumble, an overgrown lab puppy licking your face. They are kid-bro Smith Westerns, figuratively and literally. But Sunken hints at more than that."

Track listing

Personnel 
Twin Peaks
 Connor Brodner – drums
 Jack Dolan – lead vocals , bass guitar
 Clay Frankel – lead vocals , guitar
 Cadien Lake James – lead vocals , guitar

References

2013 debut albums
Twin Peaks (band) albums